Arnaud Prétot (born 16 August 1971) is a former French cyclist.

Major results

1994
1st Dijon-Troyes
1st Colmar-Strasbourg
2nd Rhône-Alpes Isère Tour
1995
 National Team Time Trial Champion (with Cédric Vasseur, Nicolas Aubier and Pascal Deramé)
2nd Tour du Poitou-Charentes
1st stage 1
1996
1st stage 1 Tour du Poitou-Charentes
1997
3rd Bayern Rundfahrt
1998
2nd Paris–Camembert
2001
3rd National Road Race Championships

References

1971 births
Living people
French male cyclists
Sportspeople from Besançon
Cyclists from Bourgogne-Franche-Comté